Hop Brook Lake is spread over three communities in New Haven County, Connecticut, United States. These communities are Naugatuck, Middlebury, and Waterbury. A dam was created across Hop Brook in Naugatuck and the lake that was created is known as Hop Brook Lake.

Construction

Construction of the dam commenced in December 1965 and was completed in December 1968, costing $6.2 million. The weir's crest elevation is  lower than the top of the dam.

The project and associated lands total  throughout Naugatuck, Middlebury, and Waterbury.

Recreation 

Hop Brook Lake contains largemouth bass and panfish. The state stocks both the lake and its feeder streams with trout. Recreational development of the reservoir includes picnic sites, walking trails, a beach, ball field, drinking water, and sanitary and parking facilities.

There have been multiple incidents of drowning at Hop Brook Lake.

https://www.courant.com/news/connecticut/hc-xpm-2002-05-05-0205051875-story.html

Park Rangers 
Hop Brook Lake is controlled by the Army Corps of Engineers.

References 

Hop Brook Lake
Hop Brook Lake
Hop Brook Lake and Dam 

Waterbury, Connecticut
Naugatuck, Connecticut
Parks in New Haven County, Connecticut
Reservoirs in Connecticut
Dams in Connecticut
Lakes of New Haven County, Connecticut
United States Army Corps of Engineers dams